Pacifichelys is an extinct genus of sea turtle from the Middle Miocene of Peru (Pisco Formation) and California (Temblor Formation). It was first named by James F. Parham and Nicholas D. Pyenson in 2010, and the type species is Pacifichelys urbinai from Peru. A second species, P. hutchisoni, was reassigned from the genus Euclastes. It is known from the Miocene of California. Like the living Ridley and loggerhead sea turtles, Pacifichelys was durophagous, consuming hard-shelled organisms with crushing jaws.

Taxonomy 
Cladogram based on Lynch and Parham (2003) and Parham and Pyenson (2010):

References

Chelonioidea
Prehistoric turtle genera
Miocene turtles
Miocene reptiles of North America
Neogene California
Miocene reptiles of South America
Laventan
Colloncuran
Friasian
Neogene Peru
Fossils of Peru
Fossil taxa described in 2010
Extinct turtles
Turtle genera